Jay Thomas Spoonhour (born October 14, 1970) is an American basketball coach. He was the head men's basketball coach at Eastern Illinois University, a position he had held from 2012 until 2021. Previously, Spoonhour served as the head coach at Moberly Area Community College in Missouri. He has also held several assistant jobs, including at Saint Louis, UNLV, Missouri and Texas-San Antonio. He served as the interim head coach of the UNLV Runnin' Rebels in 2004 after his father, Charlie Spoonhour, resigned mid-season.

Career
Spoonhour started his coaching career as a graduate assistant at Central Missouri State (1994–96). This was followed by assistant coaching jobs at Saint Louis (1996–99) and Valparaiso (2000) before getting his first head coaching job at Wabash Valley College. In his one and only season at Wabash, he led the team to a 36-1 overall record and won the 2001 NJCAA Men's Division I Basketball Championship. He was named the National Junior College Coach of the Year by both the NABC and NJCAA.

Following the national title season, Spoonhour joined his father's staff at UNLV as an assistant. He spent three seasons in Las Vegas and in 2004, he took over as the interim head coach after his father resigned midseason. In the 10 games that the younger Spoonhour coached, the Runnin' Rebels went 6–4, including an appearance in the Mountain West Conference title game and an opening round loss in the 2004 NIT.

He then went on to spend two seasons as an assistant at Missouri and three as an assistant at Texas-San Antonio before being hired as the head coach of Moberly Area Community College in Moberly, Missouri. In his three years there (2009–12), Spoonhour had a record of 63–27.

On April 6, 2012, Spoonhour was hired as the next head men's basketball coach at Eastern Illinois University of the Ohio Valley Conference. Spoonhour was chosen over a list of final candidates that also included Vanderbilt assistant David Cason, Oregon assistant Brian Fish, Nevada assistant Doug Novsek and Xavier assistant Kareem Richardson.

In his first season as head coach, the Panthers finished 11–21 overall, but managed to make the conference tournament for the first time since the 2009–10 season. The Panthers were eliminated in the first round of the Ohio Valley Conference tournament by Southeast Missouri State.

Personal life 
Jay is the son of former Missouri State, Saint Louis and UNLV head coach Charlie Spoonhour. He graduated from Glendale High School (Springfield, Missouri) in 1989 and went on to earn a bachelor's degree in physical education from Pittsburg State University. He was a four-year letter winner in basketball at Pittsburg State, earning honorable mention all-conference honors as a senior. He is married to Nicole and has three children, Gracie, Charlie and Sam.

Head coaching record

Junior college

College

References

External links
 Eastern Illinois profile

1970 births
Living people
American men's basketball coaches
American men's basketball players
Basketball coaches from Missouri
Basketball players from Missouri
Central Missouri Mules basketball coaches
College men's basketball head coaches in the United States
Eastern Illinois Panthers men's basketball coaches
Moberly Greyhounds men's basketball coaches
Missouri Tigers men's basketball coaches
Pittsburg State Gorillas men's basketball players
Saint Louis Billikens men's basketball coaches
Sportspeople from Springfield, Missouri
UNLV Runnin' Rebels basketball coaches
UTSA Roadrunners men's basketball coaches
University of Central Missouri alumni
University of Missouri alumni
Wabash Valley Warriors men's basketball coaches